Ashri bin Chuchu (born 27 February 1991 in Sarawak) is a Malaysian professional footballer who plays for Malaysia Premier League side Sarawak United mainly as a winger but can also plays as an attacking midfielder.

Club career
Born and raised in Lawas, Sarawak, Ashri attended Tabuan Jaya Sport School.

In September 2013, he was injured but soon recovered and played against Perak and Sime Darby in the 2013 Malaysia Cup. While playing for Sarawak, Ashri was once hailed as one of Sarawak's best player. However, a leg injury caused him to be sidelined for quite sometime, and Ashri had since failed to find his touch.

After more than 8 years playing for Sarawak, Ashri has decided to leave the club as his contract ends in October 2016. On 29 October 2016, he signed a contract with Kuala Lumpur.

Career statistics

International career
Ashri played in the 2013 ASEAN Games in Myanmar where he scored 2 goals against Brunei and Vietnam.

Ashri also played for Malaysia U-23 in 2014 Asian Games that was held in Incheon, South Korea.

References

External links
 

1991 births
Malaysian people of Bruneian descent
Living people
Malaysian footballers
People from Sarawak
Sarawak FA players
Kuala Lumpur City F.C. players
Malaysia Super League players
Association football wingers
Footballers at the 2014 Asian Games
Malaysian people of Malay descent
Asian Games competitors for Malaysia